Ousman Marong (born 21 June 1999) is a Gambian professional footballer who plays as a winger for Akademija Pandev.

Club career
Born in Kololi, Marong started playing in Gambia at the Superstars Academy. They sent him on loan to Israeli club Beitar Nes Tubruk where he made 24 appearances and scored 9 goals in the 2017–18 Israeli youth league.

In the winter-break of the 2018–19 season, he signed with Serbian club Trayal Kruševac along his compatriot Lamin Jobe. Marong adapted immediately in Serbia, contributing with 6 goals in 14 appearances in the second-half of the season. His performances called the attention of bigger clubs, and by June there were rumors he was going to sign with current Serbian champions, Red Star Belgrade.

International career
Before arriving to Serbia, Marong had already been member of the Gambian U-23 national team.

Career statistics

References

1999 births
Living people
Association football midfielders
Gambian footballers
Gambian expatriate footballers
Beitar Nes Tubruk F.C. players
FK Trayal Kruševac players
RFK Grafičar Beograd players
Hapoel Ra'anana A.F.C. players
Serbian First League players
Liga Leumit players
Expatriate footballers in Israel
Expatriate footballers in Serbia
Gambian expatriate sportspeople in Israel
Gambian expatriates in Serbia